Match is a chain of supermarkets owned by Louis Delhaize Group which includes around 127 supermarkets in Belgium, 117 in Northeastern France  and 28 in Luxembourg.

History 
Match was founded in 1934 by Louis Delhaize Group as local supermarkets in Belgium and expanded in 1990 in France and later in Luxembourg and in 1999 in Hungary.

Hungary 
In 1952, the Csemege retail chain was founded in Hungary, but during 1991 the state-run Csemege was bought by Julius Meinl. In 1999, the Belgian Louis Delhaize Group bought up the Csemege-Julius Meinl group. The company was first renamed Csemege Szupermarketek, and then was renamed again as Csemege-Match Group. In 2000, the Match and Smatch brands were introduced to the Hungarian retail market. During 2004, the Smatch brand was rebranded as Match supermarkets. In 2012 local retailers CBA and Coop bought most Match supermarkets, which were rebranded as CBA Supermarkets in Budapest, and rebranded as Coop in other towns. In March 2018, Alnatura products began to be sold in one French store. By the end of 2019, all stores in France carried Alnatura products.

References

External links 
 Match Belgium
 Match France
 Match Luxembourg
 Match Hungary (Archive)

Supermarkets of Belgium
Supermarkets of France
Supermarkets of Hungary